Dan Perciun (born 7 July 1991) is a Moldovan politician. He is a member of the Moldovan Parliament since March 2019.

References 

1951 births
Living people
Moldovan MPs 2019–2023